Founded in 1850, the Arkansas School for the Deaf (ASD) is a state-run public school in Little Rock, Arkansas, United States, serving deaf and hard of hearing students through residential, day school, and part-time enrollment programs. The school offers preschool through high school, and is affiliated with the Arkansas Association of the Deaf (AAD) and the National Association of the Deaf (NAD).

The school is located near the Arkansas School for the Blind (ASB) and both are administered by a five-member panel known as the Board of Trustees ASB-ASD.

The Arkansas Department of Education (ADE) classifies it as a school district.

Campus
The campus includes dormitory facilities.

Schools 
Located within the same  campus are the following schools:
 Arkansas School for the Deaf High School—serves students in grades 9 through 12. The high school has been accredited by AdvancED since 1979.
 Arkansas School for the Deaf Middle School—serves students in grades 6 through 8. 
 Arkansas School for the Deaf Elementary School—serves students in prekindergarten through grade 5.  The elementary school is accredited by AdvancED since 1979.

Athletics 
The Leopards are members of the National Deaf Interscholastic Athletic Association (NDIAA) and two different athletic conferences:
 The Great Plains Schools for the Deaf (GPSD) and,
 The Arkansas Association of Christian Schools (AACS).

The ASD Leopards compete in football, volleyball, cheer, basketball, soccer and Special Olympics.  Throughout its history, ASD has competed against other Arkansas public and private schools administered by the Arkansas Activities Association (AAA).

ASD won a state basketball championship in 1949.

See also 

 Deaf education
 Arkansas School for the Blind
 Parnell Hall (Little Rock, Arkansas)

References

External links 
 

1850 establishments in Arkansas
Boarding schools in Arkansas
Educational institutions established in 1850
High schools in Little Rock, Arkansas
Public elementary schools in Arkansas
Public middle schools in Arkansas
Public high schools in Arkansas
School districts in Arkansas
Public K-12 schools in the United States
Schools in Pulaski County, Arkansas
Schools for the deaf in the United States
School for the Deaf, Arkansas
Public boarding schools in the United States